Danijel Nizic (born 15 March 1995) is an Australian professional footballer who is a goalkeeper who plays for Sydney United.

Club career
Nizic was born in Sydney, New South Wales to Australian and Croatian parents. He started his career with local side Sydney FC, before going on trial in 2012 with League One side Portsmouth. He spent a year with the side on trial but was unable to complete a permanent move to the club due to work permit issues. In July 2013, he signed for Championship side Burnley on a two-year contract after securing a work permit, also becoming fourth goalkeeper to sign for the club in the summer.

In January 2014, he joined Conference North side Workington on an initial one-month loan along with Kyle Brownhill.

In October 2015, he joined League One side Crewe Alexandra on loan, making his debut for the club in an FA Cup first round tie against non-league Eastleigh. After first choice keeper Ben Garratt had been sent off, Nizic came on as a 64th-minute substitute.

In April 2016, it was announced that Nizic was to leave Burnley at the end of the season after his contract was not renewed.

In July 2016 Nizic signed for League Two side Morecambe, after a spell on trial at the club. Nizic left Morecambe in May 2018, citing an intention to return to Australia.

He joined A-League side Western Sydney Wanderers on 4 July 2018. In November 2019, it was announced that Nizic had been released from the Wanderers, having made one league and four cup appearances.

Honours
With Sydney United:
  National Premier Leagues NSW Championship: 2020

Career statistics

References

External links

1995 births
Living people
Association football goalkeepers
Australia under-20 international soccer players
Australian soccer players
Soccer players from Sydney
Australian people of Croatian descent
Burnley F.C. players
Workington A.F.C. players
Chorley F.C. players
Crewe Alexandra F.C. players
Morecambe F.C. players
Western Sydney Wanderers FC players
Sydney United 58 FC players
National League (English football) players
Sportsmen from New South Wales